The 2010 AFC U-16 Championship was the 14th edition of the tournament organized by the Asian Football Confederation. The top 4 teams qualified for the 2011 FIFA U-17 World Cup, hosted by Mexico.

Oman, Iran, Jordan and Australia expressed an interest in hosting the tournament, but it was once again awarded to Uzbekistan for the 2nd edition running. Qualification for the tournament started in 2009.

Venues

Qualification

Qualifiers

Squads

Draw
The draw for the AFC U-16 Championship 2010 was held on 20 May 2010 in Tashkent, Uzbekistan.

Group stage
All times are Uzbekistan Time (UZT)–UTC+5.

Group A

Group B

Group C

Group D

Knockout stage

Bracket

Quarter-finals

Semi-finals

Final

Winners

Countries to participate in 2011 FIFA U-17 World Cup
The four semi-finalists qualified for 2011 FIFA U-17 World Cup.

Goalscorers

Tournament team rankings

Broadcasters
Al Jazeera Sports Global, Abu Dhabi Sports, Dubai Sports . All channels are free-to-air at Hot Bird.

References 

"AFC U-16 Championship schedule". The-AFC.com. Asian Football Confederation. 16 July 2010.

2010 AFC U-16 Championship
Under
2010 in Uzbekistani football
International association football competitions hosted by Uzbekistan
2010 in youth association football
AFC U-16 Championships
AFC U-16 Championships